The 1997 Waldbaum's Hamlet Cup was a men's tennis tournament played on Hard courts in Long Island, United States that was part of the International Series of the 1997 ATP Tour. It was the seventeenth edition of the tournament and was held from 18–24 August 1997. Fifth-seeded Carlos Moyá won the singles title.

Finals

Singles

 Carlos Moyá defeated  Patrick Rafter, 6–4, 7–6(7–1)

Doubles

 Marcos Ondruska /  David Prinosil defeated  Mark Keil /  T.J. Middleton, 6–4, 6–4

References

 
Waldbaum's Hamlet Cup
Waldbaum's Hamlet Cup
Waldbaum's Hamlet Cup
Waldbaum's Hamlet Cup
1997